The Australian Dream is a belief in Australia of home-ownership leading to success and security.

The Australian Dream or Australian Dream may also refer to:
 The Australian Dream (1943), book of verse by Australian poet and author Ian Mudie
 Australian Dream (1986 film), an Australian comedy film directed by Jackie McKimmie
 The Australian Dream (2019 film), a documentary featuring the AFL player Adam Goodes
 Australian Dream, brand name of an analgesic cream containing histamine dihydrochloride

See also
The Dreaming, Aboriginal Australian worldview